Pat Harrison Waterway District (PHWD) is a Mississippi State Agency with headquarters in Hattiesburg.  The agency was created in 1962 with a directive of flood control in southeastern and east central Mississippi.

History and mission

When the Waterway District was created in 1962, its main mission was flood control for rivers and their tributaries along the Pascagoula River Basin in southeastern and east central Mississippi.  In addition to flood control, the agency's mission expanded to include water management and recreation.  The District derives its name from Pat Harrison, who served Mississippi as U.S. Representative (1911–19) and Senator (1919-41).

Funding
Funding for PHWD comes from ad valorem taxes collected in member Counties, park recreation fees, timber sales, and interest from investments.  PHWD is governed by an 18-member Board of Directors, with one Director appointed from each of the 15 member Counties and three Directors appointed by the Governor of Mississippi.  Full-time employees are located at the central office in Hattiesburg and at the District's eight water parks.

Member counties
Originally, there were 15 Mississippi counties in the Pat Harrison Waterway District:

Clarke County
Covington County
Forrest County
George County
Greene County
Jackson County
Jasper County
Jones County
Lamar County
Lauderdale County
Newton County
Perry County
Smith County
Stone County 
Wayne County

As of 2014, three counties (Forrest, Jasper, and Lamar) had withdrawn from the District.

In the summer of 2018, PHWD moved out of their 56-year-old office building located at 6081 U.S. Route 49 south, as part of a lawsuit settlement with Forrest County.  In September 2018, Forrest County Board of Supervisors ordered the demolition of the county-owned building, including its distinctive mural on the front facade, to facilitate future road construction near Forrest General Hospital.

Water resources
Water resources in the Pascagoula River Basin, over which Pat Harrison Waterway District has jurisdiction, include:

Big Creek
Black Creek
Bogue Homa Lake
Bossie Creek
Buckatunna Creek
Chickasawhay River
Chunky River
Escatawpa River
Gains Creek
Leaf River
Little Black Creek
Okatoma Creek
Pascagoula River
Red Creek
Tallahala Creek
Thompson Creek

Water parks
The agency oversees eight water parks with public amenities that include camp sites, boat launches, cabins, picnic areas, swimming areas, and meeting facilities.

Archusa Creek Water Park  (Quitman, MS)
Big Creek Water Park  (Soso, MS)
Dry Creek Water Park  (Mount Olive, MS)
Dunns Falls Water Park (Enterprise, MS)
Flint Creek Water Park (Wiggins)
Maynor Creek Water Park (Waynesboro, MS)
Okatibbee Water Park (Meridian, MS)
Turkey Creek Water Park (Decatur, MS)

Little Black Creek Water Park (Lumberton, MS) was formerly managed by PHWD, but was leased to a private developer in 2013.

References

State agencies of Mississippi
Parks in Mississippi
Environment of Mississippi
Government agencies established in 1962
1962 establishments in Mississippi